Guéhenno is a commune in the Morbihan department of Brittany in north-western France.

Demographics
Inhabitants of Guéhenno are called Guéhennotais.

See also
Communes of the Morbihan department
Calvary at Guéhenno

References

External links

Official site 

 Mayors of Morbihan Association 

Communes of Morbihan